Bożena Sikora-Giżyńska (born 18 April 1960) is a Polish chess player who won the Polish Women's Chess Championship in 1990. She received the FIDE title of Woman International Master (WIM) in 1986.

Chess career
In 1975 Bożena Sikora-Giżyńska won Polish Junior Chess Championship. In 1977 she won European Junior Chess Championship (U-20) in Novi Sad.

From 1975 to 1992 Bożena Sikora-Giżyńska played 17 times in the Polish Women's Chess Championship's finals. She won three medals: gold (1990), silver (1981) and bronze (1988). Also Bożena Sikora-Giżynska won gold medal in Polish Team Chess Championships (1990).

Bożena Sikora-Giżyńska won or shared first place in an international women's chess tournament in Nałęczów (1982, 1983), Iwonicz-Zdrój (1985) and Prague "Bohemians" (1987-1990, 1992). She was awarded the WIM title in 1986.

Bożena Sikora-Giżyńska played for Poland in Women's Chess Olympiads:
 In 1990, at second board in the 29th Chess Olympiad (women) in Novi Sad (+2, =4, -4).

References

External links
 
 
 
 

1960 births
Living people
Polish female chess players
Chess Woman International Masters